Jacques F. Aubert (1916, Lausanne – 1995, Lutry) was a Swiss entomologist.

Career
He specialised in Plecoptera and Ichneumonidae. He described more than 600 ichneumonid taxa, mostly originated from the Alps and the Mediterranean region. His collection of taxa was further used by other taxonomists of the same field.

The Musée de Zoologie in Lausanne, Switzerland, acquired the first part of Aubert's collection in 1983. The second part followed between 1991 and 2008.

He died in Lutry, Switzerland on August 4, 1995.

References

Cherix, D.; Gris, G. 1976: [Aubert, J.] Mitteilungen der Schweizerischen Entomologischen Gesellschaft, Zürich 49, pp. 5, Portrait
Goeldin de Tiefenau, P.; Sartori, M. 1996: [Aubert, J.] Bulletin Romand d'Entomologie, Genève 14 (1) pp. 89–99, Portr. + Schr.verz.
Goeldin de Tiefenau, P.; Sartori, M. 1996: [Aubert, J.] Mitteilungen der Schweizerischen Entomologischen Gesellschaft, Zürich 69 (1), pp. 1–8, Portr. + Schr.verz.
Seraina Klopfstein & Hannes Baur Catalogue of the type specimens of Ichneumonidae (Hymenoptera) in the Jacques F. Aubert collection at the Musée de Zoologie, Lausanne, Switzerland (Zootaxa 3081) online]
Obituary read by P. Zwick in honour of the late Professeur Jacques Aubert at the XII International Symposium on Plecoptera, Lausanne, 18–20 August 1995 Lists Plecoptera publications

Swiss entomologists
1916 births
1995 deaths
Scientists from Lausanne
20th-century Swiss zoologists